Nuno Gonçalo Rocha Moreira (born 16 June 1999) is a Portuguese professional footballer who plays as a winger for F.C. Vizela.

Club career

Sporting CP
Born in Espinho, Aveiro District, Moreira spent his entire youth career in Lisbon with Sporting CP. He made his senior debut with the club's under-23 team, later appearing for the reserve one.

Moreira scored his first goal for Sporting B on 25 October 2020, closing the 4–1 home win against Belenenses SAD B in the third division.

Vizela
On 19 June 2021, Moreira signed a three-year contract with F.C. Vizela, with Sporting retaining 50% of the player's rights. He played his first match as a professional on 24 July, coming off at half-time of an eventual 2–1 away loss to C.F. Estrela da Amadora in the first round of the Taça da Liga. His Primeira Liga bow took place on 6 August, when he replaced the same player who had replaced him the previous game, Francis Cann, in the 3–0 defeat at former side Sporting.

Moreira scored for the first time in the top flight on 30 April 2022, but in a 4–2 away loss against eventual champions FC Porto.

References

External links

1999 births
Living people
People from Espinho, Portugal
Sportspeople from Aveiro District
Portuguese footballers
Association football wingers
Primeira Liga players
Campeonato de Portugal (league) players
Sporting CP B players
F.C. Vizela players